Luigi Busà (born 9 October 1987) is an Italian karateka. He is a two-time gold medalist at the World Karate Championships and a five-time gold medalist at the European Karate Championships. He represented Italy at the 2020 Summer Olympics in Tokyo, Japan, winning the first-ever gold medal in the men's kumite 75 kg event.

Career
In 2015, he won the silver medal in the men's kumite 75 kg event at the 2015 European Games held in Baku, Azerbaijan. In the final, he lost against Rafael Aghayev of Azerbaijan.

In 2019, he won the gold medal in the men's kumite 75 kg event at the 2019 European Karate Championships held in Guadalajara, Spain.

He won one of the bronze medals in the men's 75 kg event at the 2022 Mediterranean Games held in Oran, Algeria.

Achievements

See also
Italy at the 2020 Summer Olympics

References

External links
 
 

1987 births
Living people
Place of birth missing (living people)
Italian male karateka
Karateka at the 2015 European Games
European Games medalists in karate
European Games silver medalists for Italy
Competitors at the 2009 Mediterranean Games
Competitors at the 2013 Mediterranean Games
Competitors at the 2022 Mediterranean Games
Mediterranean Games medalists in karate
Mediterranean Games silver medalists for Italy
Mediterranean Games bronze medalists for Italy
Olympic karateka of Italy
Karateka at the 2020 Summer Olympics
Medalists at the 2020 Summer Olympics
Olympic medalists in karate
Olympic gold medalists for Italy
21st-century Italian people